The 1930 Western Maori by-election was a by-election during the 23rd New Zealand Parliament. The election was held on 8 October 1930. It was held on the same day as another by-election in Waipawa.

The seat of Western Maori became vacant following the death of the sitting member Sir Maui Pomare on 27 June. The by-election was won by Taite Te Tomo.

Candidates
Both Pomare and Te Tomo were members of the Reform Party, then in opposition. Haanui Tokauru Ratana is described as Independent or Ratana. Pei Te Hurinui Jones is described as Independent or Young Maori Party. He later supported National.

Results
The following table gives the election results:

References

Western Maori 1930
1930 elections in New Zealand
Māori politics